"Heart of Stone" is the twenty-sixth solo single by the American rock singer-songwriter and bass guitarist Suzi Quatro. It was originally released in October 1982 as the lead single from her eighth studio album, Main Attraction, only in the UK and Spain, and was also her first single release by the record label, Polydor.
It was co-written by Quatro and keyboardist Chris Andrews, the latter of whom also co-produced it. The single release features the song "Remote Control" as the B-side, which also appeared on the Main Attraction album.

The song was recorded at The Studio Toppersfield, in Essex, England, while the mixing of the track was finished at The Townhouse, in London.

Background
The song is notably Quatro's last single to reach the top 75 in the UK. It is also one of only two of Quatro's self composed singles to chart, the other being "Mamma's Boy" in 1980. Despite several TV appearances and some radio airplay Heart of Stone failed to climb no higher than #60 in the United Kingdom, and stayed in the charts for three weeks.

Compilation appearances
As well as the song's single release, it has featured on a few compilation albums released by Quatro. It was initially included on The Best Of Suzi Quatro, in 1984. The song was then included on the 1991 compilation, Rock Hard. It was also included on the 4-disc box set The Girl From Detroit City.

Track listing
7" single (POSP 477)
"Heart of Stone"
"Remote Control"

References

Suzi Quatro songs
1982 songs
1982 singles
Polydor Records singles
Songs written by Chris Andrews (singer)